Roberto Enríquez Asenjo (born 20 January 1968) is a Spanish actor. He is known for his performances in television series such as Locked Up, Hispania, la leyenda and La señora or in films such as Fat People.

Biography 
Roberto Enríquez Asenjo was born in Fabero, Province of León, on 20 January 1968, although he was raised in Valladolid. His family is from Arganza. He grew up in "Los Pajarillos" neighborhood. He trained as an actor at the Valladolid's Escuela de Arte Dramático from 1986 to 1989. He moved to Madrid afterwards.

Enríquez started his acting career as a stage actor in the late 1980s. Enríquez performed in the sitcom Colegio Mayor, which began airing on the Madrilenian regional broadcaster in 1994. He also landed a recurring role in the 1995 sitcom Pepa y Pepe, performing Pol, an aspiring model and one of the boyfriends of the character played by María Adánez. He has his debut in a featured film with his performance in Pepe Guindo (1999). His first starring performance came with the telenovela Esencia de poder, playing the role of Javier Márquez. He also appeared in television series such as Ellas son así, Hospital Central and Lobos, La señora and 14 de abril. La República (in which he reprised his role in La Señora). His breakout film performance was his starring role in the 2002 film El alquimista impaciente, which earned him a nomination to the Goya Award for Best New Actor. He performed the role of Paolo Orsini in the 2006 film Los Borgia. He also performed in other feature films such as Azuloscurocasinegro, Vidas pequeñas and Fat People.

In 2010, Enríquez was cast to play the lead character of the historical drama series Hispania, la leyenda, Viriato. He later performed the role of Muley Hacén, Sultan of Granada and Boabdil's father, in the second season of Isabel. From 2015 to 2018, he starred in the thriller drama series Vis a vis (Locked Up) in the role of Fabio Martínez, a prison officer. He appeared as Mauro, Viruca's former husband in the 2020 Netflix series El desorden que dejas (The Mess You Leave Behind). He starred as lead character in the 2021 historical romantic drama La cocinera de Castamar.

Filmography 

Television

Film

Awards and nominations

References 

20th-century Spanish male actors
21st-century Spanish male actors
Spanish male film actors
Spanish male television actors
Spanish male stage actors
1968 births
Living people